Nicktoons Winners Cup Racing is an racing video game developed by American studio Pronto Games, Inc. and published by ValuSoft, with THQ. It was released on February 15, 2006, in the United States, exclusively for the Microsoft Windows operating system. It is the second racing game released in the Nicktoons series, succeeding Nicktoons Racing and preceding Nicktoons Nitro.

Gameplay
The game has the player race around different race courses as various Nicktoons characters. Each racer has their own unique vehicle to drive, reflective of their character, as well as unique ability, which can be used against other racers. The environments of the courses are also stylized after locations from their respective shows, with each show getting one track each.

The game has three modes for players to choose from, each with their own unique gameplay styles. Winner’s Cup, the game’s story mode, Quick Race, a versus mode, and Free Diving, a sandbox mode to drive around the tracks. There are also various unlockable mini games.

By completing the Winner’s Cup, the player can unlock new playable characters and minigames.

Playable Characters 

 SpongeBob SquarePants (SpongeBob SquarePants)
Sheldon J. Planktonunlockable (SpongeBob SquarePants)
Jimmy Neutron (The Adventures of Jimmy Neutron, Boy Genius)
Professor Calamitousunlockable (The Adventures of Jimmy Neutron, Boy Genius)
Danny Fenton (Danny Phantom)
Vlad Plasmiusunlockable (Danny Phantom)
 Timmy Turner (The Fairly OddParents)
 Mr. Crockerunlockable (The Fairly OddParents)

Racetracks 

 Bikini Bottom - (SpongeBob SquarePants)
 Retroville - (The Adventures of Jimmy Neutron, Boy Genius)
 Dimmsdale -  (The Fairly OddParents) 
 Amity Park - (Danny Phantom)

Reception 
The game currently holds a 6.6 rating on GameSpot and a 5.1 on Game Pressure.

References

 
 
 

2006 video games
Crossover racing games
Kart racing video games
Nicktoon racing games
Nicktoons video games
North America-exclusive video games
THQ games
SpongeBob SquarePants video games
Windows games
Windows-only games
Video games developed in the United States
Pronto Games games